PCD may refer to:

Businesses and organizations

Political parties
 Democratic Conservative Party (Spanish: Partido Conservador Demócrata), in Nicaragua
 Democratic Society Party (Kurdish: Partiya Civaka Demokratîk), in Turkey
 Party of the Democratic Centre (Spain)
 Christian Democratic Party (France) (French: Parti chrétien-démocrate)
 Democratic Convergence Party (São Tomé and Príncipe) (Portuguese: Partido de Convergência Democrática)

Other organizations
 Personal Communications Devices, a mobile phone development and marketing company
 Partnership for Child Development, an organisation within Imperial College London
 Providence Country Day School, in East Providence, Rhode Island, U.S.

Science and technology

Biology and medicine
 Paraneoplastic cerebellar degeneration, a paraneoplastic syndrome
 Phlegmasia cerulea dolens, an uncommon severe form of lower extremity deep venous thrombosis
 Primary ciliary dyskinesia, a rare autosomal recessive genetic disorder
 Programmed cell death, the suicide of a cell in a multicellular organism
 Protocatechuate 3,4-dioxygenase, an enzyme

Computing and electronics
 Proximity coupling device, a reader device for NFC Cards in ISO/IEC 14443
 Photo CD, a system designed by Kodak in 1991
 Picture CD, a later Kodak product
 Process control daemon, an open-source process controller 
 Point Cloud Data, a file format for Point Cloud Library

Other uses in science and technology
 Polycrystalline diamond, artificial diamond

Music
 The Pussycat Dolls, an American  girl group and dance ensemble
 PCD (album), 2005
 Phillips, Craig and Dean, a contemporary Christian music trio

Other uses
 Picard language, ISO 639-3 language code pcd
 Pitch Circle Diameter, a measure of bolt spacing when arranged in a circle
 Process-centered design, in design methodology